Lamont Dorrell, known as Ayatollah,  is a hip-hop record producer from Queens, New York was born on March 8, 1971. Who has produced for predominantly New York-based rappers including Mos Def, Talib Kweli, R.A. the Rugged Man, Tragedy Khadafi, Wordsworth, Vast Aire, Afu-Ra, Guru, M.O.P., Inspectah Deck, Cormega, Ghostface Killah as well as many others. R.A. the Rugged Man had said in an interview that he was the first person to ever buy a beat from Ayatollah. Broadly speaking Ayatollah's production encompasses a soulful, authentic east coast hip-hop sound which has brought him steady success and acclaim since the late 1990s.

Biography
Ayatollah first received mainstream recognition after producing Rawkus rapper Mos Def's hit "Ms. Fat Booty", the first single off his Black on Both Sides album; whilst subsequently receiving a gold plaque for probably his most well-known track to date, Styles P's hit "The Life", featuring Pharoahe Monch of Organized Konfusion, which appeared on the Rawkus Records compilation Soundbombing III.

Ayatollah is a favoured producer of many Queensbridge MCs in particular, and after working with Cormega on Rap's a Hustle on his debut The Realness, the latter spoke of working on a subsequent album produced solely by Ayatollah, an eagerly awaited project which has since failed to transpire.

He has released instrumental albums, 2003's unofficial debut So Many Reasons to Rhyme and since then in 2006, Listen, on Nomadic Wax, Now Playing on Nature Sounds, and The Quixotic. He worked with Rakim on "A Cold Feeling", an unreleased song for The Wash soundtrack.

Ayatollah's production has been featured on many releases. Brooklyn newcomer Okai's 2006 debut album Dekonstruktion of the Mind was entirely produced by Ayatollah. He became the producer for the group T.H.U.G. Angelz, with Wu-Tang Clan affiliates Hell Razah and Shabazz the Disciple.

In 2015, Ayatollah began working with the hip hop production team Widowmaker to form the trio COLOSSUS. Their debut instrumental album, Ayatollah Presents: COLOSSUS, was released digitally on June 7, 2015. A limited vinyl pressing was released in mid-August, 2015.

Discography

Albums
So Many Reasons to Rhyme (2003) Organized Krhyme Unit Inc.
Personal Legend Vol.1 (2003) Old Negro Spirituals Music
Listen (2006) Soundchron Records
Now Playing (2006) Nature Sounds
Louder (2008) Triboro Bridge Commission
Drum Machine (2008) Nature Sounds
The Quixotic Remix EP (2010)
The Quixotic (2010) Nature Sounds
Cocoon (2010) Nature Sounds
Live From The MPC 60 (2010) Nature Sounds
Fingertips (2011) Nature Sounds
Avant Garde (2013) Elementality Productions
Be Real Black For Me (2014) Elementality Productions
Who Is My Soul Brother? (2015) Day By Day Entertainment
Wendee (2015) Soulspazm/Elementality Productions
Ayatollah Presents: COLOSSUS (2015) (with Widowmaker) Scrimshaw Wax
The Box Cutter Brothers (with Drasar Monumental) (2015) Day By Day Entertainment
Box Cutter Brothers II (with Drasar Monumental) (2015) Day By Day Entertainment
Weapons of Mass Production: Episode 1 (with Budget Money) (2016) 
Blaxplotiation (with Hell Razah) (2017) Mixtapes.com
Box Cutter Brothers - B.C.B. 4 (with Drasar Monumental) (2017) Vendetta Vinyl
Box Cutter Brothers - 5 (with Drasar Monumental) (2018) Vendetta Vinyl
Karmic Points (2018) Ayatollah Beats
Phantom Of The Chakras (2018) Ayatollah Beats

Production

Nolage "A Few Shades Lighter" & "The Grind" (Aquire Nolage, 2019)
Killa Kidz "Who Write This Song" (Streets Is Real, 2019)
Q-Unique "Brooklyn Stomp" (The Mechanic, 2018)
Jaysaun "Opinions" (Kill Ya Boss, 2018)
J-Love "Best That I Got" (Return Of The Polo Bear, 2018) 
Alpha Faktion "The Real Truth" (Creative Control, 2017)
Hell Razah "Brooklyn Baby" (The Hood Transporter 3, 2016)
Gage-One "Lay It Down" (Storm Shadow Mixtape, 2016)
Talib Kweli "Bright As The Stars" (Train Of Thought: Lost Lyrics, Rare Releases + Beautiful B-Sides, Volume One, 2015)
Capone-N-Noreaga "Future" & "Not Stick You Pt. 2" (feat. Tragedy) (Lessons, 2015)
Big Noyd, Large Professor, Kool G Rap "Naturally Born" (2014)
Illa Ghee "Talking In A 3rd Person" (Social Graffiti, 2014)
Vast Aire "Red Pill Feat. Karniege" (Best Of The Best Vol. 1, 2013)
One Dae "Daes & Times Feat. C-Rayz Walz" (Daes & Times, 2013)
J-Love "Outdoors Postcards", "As If I Was the Last" (Pardon My Intrusion, 2013)
Killah Priest "Super God" (The Psychic World of Walter Reed) (2013)
Apathy "School for Scoundrels Feat. Celph Titled" (2012)
Moka Only Bridges (Entire Album) (2012)
Satchel Page "Young Patriarch" (Entire Album) (2010)
Cormega "Rapture" (2009)
Traum "Hip Hop Feat. Big Noyd" (Mad Dreamz, 2009)
Traum "Blast Off Feat. Lil' Fame of M.O.P. and Cormega" (Mad Dreamz, 2009)
Sean Price "Crazy" (2007)
Saul Abraham - Love's Gonna Flow (2007)
eMC "Four Brothers" (2007)
Okai Dekonstruktion of the Mind (Entire Album) (2006)
Tragedy Khadafi "No Equivalent" (Thug Matrix, 2005)
Sean Price "Spliff N Wessun" (Monkey Barz, 2005)
Saigon "Do You Know" (Do You Know EP, 2005)
R.A. the Rugged Man "Chains", "Make Luv Outro" (Die Rugged Man Die, 2004)
Wordsworth "Right Now", "Evol" (Mirror Music, 2004)
Cormega "Bring it Back" (Legal Hustle, 2004)
Vast Aire "Elixir" (Look Mom...No Hands, 2004)
The Last Emperor "Karma", "Tiger Trail" (Music, Magic, Myth, 2003)
Inspectah Deck "The Movement", "Who Got It", "Shorty Right There", "Vendetta", "That Nigga" (The Movement, 2003)
Afu-Ra "Think Before You..." (Life Force Radio, 2002)
R.A. the Rugged Man "You Don't Wanna Fuck Wit" (2002)
Royce Da 5'9" "Life" (Rock City (Version 2.0), 2002)
Styles P & Pharoahe Monch "My Life" (Soundbombing III, 2002)
Talib Kweli "Joy", "The Proud" (Quality, 2002)
Screwball 4 tracks (Loyalty, 2001)
Cormega "Rap's a Hustle" (The Realness, 2001)
Ghostface Killah "WTC Pt. 2"
Guru "Cry" (Baldhead Slick & Da Click, 2001)
Tragedy Khadafi "Lift Ya Glass" (Against All Odds, 2001)
Masta Ace "Hold U" (Disposable Arts, 2001)
Mos Def "Ms. Fat Booty 2" (Lyricist Lounge 2, 2000)
Cella Dwellas "Game of Death" (The Last Shall Be First, 2000)
Mos Def "Ms. Fat Booty", "Know That" (Black on Both Sides, 1999)
Ilacoin, Labba, Black Rob "By a Stranger" (2000)

References

1971 births
Living people
American hip hop record producers
Musicians from New York City
Wu-Tang Clan affiliates
Record producers from New York (state)